Varela is a Spanish and Portuguese surname of Galician origin. It may also refer to:

 19023 Varela, an asteroid
 Florencio Varela, a city in Buenos Aires Province, Argentina
 José Pedro Varela, a city in Lavalleja, Uruguay
 Los Varela, a village and municipality in Argentina
 Palmar de Varela, a municipality and town in Caribbean, Colombia
 Ponte da Varela, a bridge in Aveiro District, Portugal
 Varela, a town in Guinea-Bissau that sits on the Guinea-Bissau–Senegal border
 Varela (Buenos Aires Underground), a mass transit station
 Varela Project, movement for political change in Cuba
 Vitalina Varela, a 2019 Portuguese drama film